Gephyromantis klemmeri, commonly known as Klemmer's Madagascar frog, is a species of frog in the family Mantellidae. It is endemic to Madagascar.  Its natural habitats are subtropical or tropical moist lowland forests and subtropical or tropical high-altitude shrubland.  It is threatened by habitat loss.

References

Endemic fauna of Madagascar
klemmeri
Taxa named by Jean Marius René Guibé
Taxonomy articles created by Polbot
Amphibians described in 1974